Holly Edmondston (born 5 December 1996) is a New Zealand racing cyclist. She competed at the 2020 Summer Olympics, in women's team pursuit, and women's omnium.	

In February 2019, she won the bronze medal in the women's team pursuit event at the 2019 UCI Track Cycling World Championships.

Major results
Source:
2017
 3rd White Spot / Delta Road Race
2019
 National Road Championships
3rd time trial
5th road race

References

External links
 

1996 births
Living people
New Zealand female cyclists
New Zealand track cyclists
Place of birth missing (living people)
Olympic cyclists of New Zealand
Cyclists at the 2020 Summer Olympics